Eighth Regiment Armory can refer to:

 Eighth Regiment Armory (Bronx)
 Eighth Regiment Armory (Chicago)